This is a list of swimming competitions conducted in pool and open water environments. Pool competitions include long course metres (50 metre pool), short course metres (25 metre pool), and short course yards (25 yard pool) formats.

Olympic committee events
Olympic Games, pool since 1896, open water since 2008, for example swimming at the 1964 Summer Olympics
Youth Olympic Games, since 2010, for example swimming at the 2014 Summer Youth Olympics
 African Games, since 1965, co-organized with the African Union and Association of African Sports Confederations
Asian Games, Olympic committee organized since 1982, 1951 to 1982 organized by the Asian Games Federation
Australian Youth Olympic Festival, 2001 to 2013
European Games, 2015
European Youth Summer Olympic Festival, since 1991, for example swimming at the 2017 European Youth Summer Olympic Festival
Indian Ocean Island Games, for example swimming at the 2015 Indian Ocean Island Games
Pan Arab Games, since 1953
World Beach Games, open water since 2019, for example open water swimming at the 2019 World Beach Games

International swimming federation events
World Aquatics Championships (50 m pool, open water), pool since 1973, open water since 1991
World Swimming Championships (25 m pool), since 1993, for example 2021 FINA World Swimming Championships (25 m)
World Open Water Championships, 2000 to 2010, for example 2002 FINA World Open Water Swimming Championships
World Junior Open Water Swimming Championships
World Junior Swimming Championships, since 2006, for example 2022 FINA World Junior Swimming Championships
World Masters Championships, since 1978, 1978 and 1984 held by an organization other than FINA
Swimming World Cup, since 1988, for example 2016 FINA Swimming World Cup
Marathon Swim World Series, since 2007, for example 2022 FINA Marathon Swim World Series
Champions Swim Series, since 2019
Aquatics Festival, open water since 2021, for example Abu Dhabi Aquatics Festival

African events
 African Aquatics Championships
 African Swimming Championships, since 1974, for example 2021 African Swimming Championships
 African Junior Swimming Championships, since 1988
 African Juniors Aquatics Championships
 African Masters Aquatics Championships

American events
 Pan American Games, pool since 1951, open water since 2007
 Junior Pan American Games, since 2021, for example 2021 Junior Pan American Games
 South American Games, pool since 1978, open water since 2006
 South American Youth Games, since 2013
 South American Aquatics Championships 
 South American Swimming Championships, since 1929, for example 2016 South American Swimming Championships
 South American Masters Aquatics Championships
 South American Juniors Aquatics Championships
 South American Beach Games, open water since 2009
 Central American and Caribbean Swimming Championships, since 1960
 Caribbean Islands Swimming Championships, since 1976
 CAMEX, since 1986
 CARIFTA Swimming Championships, since 1985
 Bolivarian Games, since 1938
 Bolivarian Beach Games, open water since 2012, for example 2012 Bolivarian Beach Games

Asian events
Asian Swimming Championships, since 1980, for example 2012 Asian Swimming Championships
Asian Age Group Swimming Championships
Asian Open Water Swimming Championships
South Asian Games (SAG), since 1984
Southeast Asian Games (SEA), since 1959
Southeast Asian Swimming Championships (SEA), since 1977
West Asian Games, since 1997, for example swimming at the 2005 West Asian Games
South Asian Swimming Championships 
Central Asian Swimming Championships 
West Asian Swimming Championships
Asian Indoor and Martial Arts Games, short course swimming, since 2005

European events
European Aquatics Championships (50 m pool, open water), pool since 1926, open water since 1995, for example 2022 European Aquatics Championships
European Short Course Championships (25 m pool), since 1996, post-European Sprint Swimming Championships
European Sprint Swimming Championships, 1991 to 1994, pre-European Short Course Swimming Championships, for example 1994 European Sprint Swimming Championships
European Open Water Swimming Championships, 1989 to 2016
European Junior Open Water Swimming Championships, for example 2012 European Junior Open Water Swimming Championships
European Junior Swimming Championships, since 1967
European Masters Championships, since 1987
Baltic States Swimming Championships, for example 2021 Baltic States Swimming Championships
Open de Paris de Natation

Oceania events
 Pacific Games, 1963 to 1979 and 1987 to present
 Oceania Swimming Championships, since 1993, for example 2010 Oceania Swimming Championships
 Oceania Masters Championships

National championships
Australian Swimming Championships
Australian Short Course Swimming Championships, for example 2009 Australian Short Course Swimming Championships
British Swimming Championships
Finnish championships in aquatics, 1906 to 1926, for example 1921 Finnish championships in aquatics
French Elite Open Swimming Championships
Irish Open Short Course Swimming Championships
Italian Spring Championships, open to international competition
Lithuanian Swimming Championships, for example 2020 Lithuanian Swimming Championships
Russian National Swimming Championships
South Africa National Open Water Championships
Swedish Short Course Swimming Championships, since 1953
Swedish Swimming Championships, since 1899
Telkom SA National Aquatic Championships (South Africa), for example 2022 SA National Swimming Championships, open to international competition
United States Open Water National Championships
United States Short Course Swimming Championships
United States Spring Swimming Championships, since 1962
United States Swimming National Championships, for example 2019 USA Swimming Championships, open to international competition when not incorporated as part of the US Olympic Trials

School and university events
World University Games, since 1959
World School Swimming Championship, since 1991
Asian Schools Swimming Championships
NAIA Men's Swimming and Diving Championships, since 1957
NAIA Women's Swimming and Diving Championships, since 1981
NCAA Division I men's swimming and diving championships, since 1924
NCAA Division I Women's Swimming and Diving Championships, since 1982
NCAA Men's Division II Swimming and Diving Championships, since 1964
NCAA Men's Division III Swimming and Diving Championships, since 1975
NCAA Swimming Championship (Philippines), since 1926
NCAA Women's Division II Swimming and Diving Championships, since 1982
NCAA Women's Division III Swimming and Diving Championships, since 1982

Religious affiliation events
Islamic Solidarity Games, since 2005
Maccabiah Games, since 1932

Military and life saving events
Military World Games, since 1995
World Life Saving Championships, since 1955

Recurring lake, river, channel, harbour, and ocean swims
Auckland Harbour Crossing Swim, since 2004
Basel Rhine Swim, since 1980
Bosphorus Cross Continental Swim, since 1989
Brighton Jetty Classic, since 2006
Cadiz Freedom Swim
Cole Classic, since 1982
Cruce a Nado Internacional, since 1980
Lake Zurich Swim
Lucky's Lake Swim, since 1989
Meis–Kaş Swim, since 2005
Midmar Mile, since 1974
Oceans Seven, since 2008
Pier to Pub, since 1981
Race to Prince's Bridge, 1913 to 1963 and 1987 to 1991
Rottnest Channel Swim
Santa Fe-Coronda Marathon, since 1961
Shark Island Swim Challenge, since 1987
Vansbrosimningen, since 1950

LGBT events
 Gay Games

Para swimming events
Paralympic Games, since 1960
World Para Swimming Championships, 1990 to 2015 as IPC Swimming Championships, since 2017 as World Para Swimming Championships, for example 2017 World Para Swimming Championships
IPC Swimming World Championships (Short Course), held once, 2009 IPC Swimming World Championships 25 m
World Deaf Swimming Championships
INAS World Swimming Championships
Commonwealth Games, included as part of the swimming program, since 2002
World Para Swimming European Championships
Australian Swimming Championships, included as part of the swimming program as multi-class events, for example 2019 Australian Swimming Championships
Telkom SA National Aquatic Championships, included as part of the swimming program as multi-class events, open to international competition

Finswimming events
World Games, since 1981, for example finswimming at the 2022 World Games
Finswimming World Championships, since 1976
Texas Open Finswimming Invitational, since 1999

Other
Arab Swimming Championships, for example 2018 Arab Swimming Championships
Brazil Swimming Trophy, since 1962
Commonwealth Games, since 1930
Commonwealth Youth Games, since 2000
Duel in the Pool between USA and Australia, European All-stars, 2003 to 2022, for example 2009 Duel in the Pool
International Swimming League, since 2019, for example 2021 International Swimming League
José Finkel Trophy, since 1972
 Junior Pan Pacific Swimming Championships, since 2005, organized by Pan Pacific Charter nations's swimming federations, for example 2022 Junior Pan Pacific Swimming Championships
Mare Nostrum series
Mediterranean Beach Games, finswimming and open water since 2015, for example 2015 Mediterranean Beach Games
Mediterranean Games, since 1951
Nico Sapio Trophy
Pan Pacific Swimming Championships, since 1985, organized by Pan Pacific Charter nations's swimming federations, for example 2018 Pan Pacific Swimming Championships
Sette Colli Trophy
South Africa Swimming Grand Prix series
Swedish Swimming Grand Prix series
USA Swimming Pro Swim Series
U.S. Open Championships, since 1985

See also
Geography of swimming
History of swimming

References

History of swimming
Swimming
 
Competitions